Chandless River is a river of Peru and the Acre state in western Brazil, named after the British explorer William Chandless. It is a tributary of the Purus River

The river originates in Peru. 
After crossing the border into Brazil it flows in a north east direction through the  Chandless State Park, created in 2004, which protects an area of rainforest with bamboos that contains various endemic species of flora and fauna.
The main tributaries of the Chandless in this section are the Cuchichá and Chandless-chá streams. The Cuchicá forms the northern border of the park to the point where it joins the Chandless.
The Chandless joins the Purus to the north of the park.

See also
List of rivers of Acre

References
Brazilian Ministry of Transport

Rivers of Acre (state)
Rivers of Peru
International rivers of South America